Thomas Dale Hawk (born September 18, 1946) is a Democratic member of the Kansas Senate for the 22nd district. He was formerly a member of the Kansas House of Representatives, representing the 67th District, serving 2005-2011, until being defeated by Republican Susan Mosier.

Hawk is the owner of Tom Hawk Incorporated Professional Photography. He previously served as superintendent, school administrator, counselor and teacher at Manhattan-Ogden Public Schools. He received his BS in math education, MS in counseling, and PhD in educational administration from Kansas State University.

Hawk previously served on the Governor's Education Policy Task Force, City-County Land Use Task Force, and Governor's Best Team for Agriculture and Natural Resources.

In the 2012 election, Hawk was elected to the Kansas Senate for the 22nd district against Republican Bob Reader, who had defeated incumbent Roger Reitz in the Republican primary election. The 22nd district includes all of Clay and Riley counties and portions of Geary County.

Committee membership
 Taxation
 Vision 2020 (Ranking Member)
 Social Services Budget

Major donors
The top 5 donors to Hawk's 2008 campaign:
1. Carpenters District Council of Kansas City/UBC 	$1,000 	
2. Kansas Contractors Assoc 	$1,000 	
3. Kansas National Education Assoc 	$1,000 	
4. Carpenter Local 918 	$1,000
5. Kansans for Lifesaving Cures 	$1,000

References

External links
 Official Website
 Project Vote Smart profile
 Kansas Votes profile
 Campaign contributions: 2002, 2004, 2006, 2008

1946 births
Democratic Party members of the Kansas House of Representatives
Living people
People from Colby, Kansas
Politicians from Manhattan, Kansas
Kansas State University alumni
Schoolteachers from Kansas
American photographers
21st-century American politicians